Duberildo Jaque Araneda (7 April 1921 – 22 May 2022) was a Chilean lawyer and politician. A member of the Radical Party and later the Chilean Social Democracy Party, he served in the Chamber of Deputies from 1961 to 1973.

Life and career 
Jaque was born on 7 April 1921, to Pedro Jaque and Isidora Araneda in Carahue, Chile. He studied at the Liceo de Temuco and law at the University of Chile and was sworn in with the "Commercial air navigation in Chile" thesis as a lawyer on 2 December 1949. He served as both a professor of Civic Education and Political Economy at the Liceo de Niñas de Concepción and a local police judge in Penco. He was a Public Law Seminar assistant and Administrative Law professor at the School of Law at the University of Concepción.

He was a Ministry of the Interior official from 1945 till 1949. Between 1949 and 1961, he was the Municipality of Concepción's secretary-attorney and occasional deputy mayor.

As a Radical Party of Chile member, he led the Radical Youth of the 8th Commune of the First District of Santiago and was a member of the Radical Assembly of Concepción and the Political Commission of the party in the 23rd National Convention.

In 1961, 1965, and 1969 he was elected deputy for the Seventeenth Departmental Group "Concepción, Tomé, Talcahuano." He was a member of the Permanent Commission of Internal Government, Permanent Commission of Housing and Urbanism and Latin American Integration and National Defense. In 1972 he joined the Radical Party of the Left and in 1973 ran unsuccessfully for reelection.

On 14 March 1983, during the Military dictatorship of Chile he was one of the signatories of the Democratic Manifesto which gave rise to the Democratic Alliance, which brought together Christian Democrats, Socialists, Conservative-Liberals, and Social Democrats  to oppose Augusto Pinochet's regime.

Jaque died on 22 May 2022, at the age of 101.

References

1921 births
2022 deaths
People from Cautín Province
Radical Party of Chile politicians
Chilean Social Democracy Party politicians
Deputies of the XLIV Legislative Period of the National Congress of Chile
Deputies of the XLV Legislative Period of the National Congress of Chile
Deputies of the XLVI Legislative Period of the National Congress of Chile
20th-century Chilean lawyers
University of Chile alumni
University of Concepción alumni
Academic staff of the University of Concepción
Chilean centenarians
Men centenarians